Dilara Hava Tunç (born 12 August 1998), known professionally as Hava, is a German rapper and singer of Bosniak and Turkish descent.

Life 
She was born and lives in Hamm. Her father originates from Aksaray in Turkey. Her mother was born in Germany to parents from Doboj in Bosnia and Herzegovina. Hava has six siblings and one stepbrother. Apart from her brother Adem and her sister Dalia, all of them are much younger than Hava. Although at home exclusively German was spoken, Hava can also speak Bosnian and Turkish. She is Muslim, in her childhood she also wore a headscarf for many years.

In her own words, she taught herself to play the piano from age five and dreamed of making music one day. Hava first gained fame through vocal videos on social media and later though her first snippet of "Heartbreaker". Her first single "Heartbreaker" was released in April 2019 and shared i.a. by the rappers Nimo, Moe Phoenix, Sun Diego and Delil Cartel and German rap media also report on it. She reached number 130 in the German Spotify weekly charts. Her second single "Korb" was even more successful and on number 91 of the German Spotify weekly charts.

"Kein Schlaf" with Nimo is Hava's first collaboration with another rapper and was released on 6 December 2019. The single achieved more than 1 million streams million views and first place on YouTube and Spotify Germany on the first day. The song has also reached gold status in Germany and platinum status in Switzerland. The song also reached the top of the Official German Single Charts. Hava is the fifth German female rapper (after Namika, Juju, Shirin David and Loredana) who achieved it over the last two years.

She is in relationship with German rapper Dardan.

Discography

Singles

As lead artist

As featured artist

References

External links 
 
Wer ist Hava? Die ersten Infos! 
Hava on Spotify
This Is: HAVA - alle Infos zur gehypten Newcomerin von Zino BACKSPIN on YouTube

German rappers
1998 births
Living people
People from Hamm
German people of Bosnia and Herzegovina descent
German people of Turkish descent
German women musicians
German women rappers